James Oliver Hallet (born March 30, 1960) is an American professional golfer who played on the PGA Tour.

Amateur career 
Hallet was born in Hyannis, Massachusetts and was raised in South Yarmouth, Massachusetts on Cape Cod. He attended Dennis-Yarmouth Regional High School. He grew up playing golf at Bass River Golf Course in Yarmouth. He played college golf at Bryant College, where he was a four-time Division II All-American. He was also the goaltender for the Bryant hockey team for some time. He stated later as an adult that he was "an overnight success" and did not play a lot of junior golf. He reached the semi-final of the 1982 U.S. Amateur which was played in his home state of Massachusetts at The Country Club.

Hallet's good play at the U.S. Amateur qualified him for the 1983 Masters Tournament. He first achieved national media attention with an opening round 68 (−4), one shot back of the lead. He continued to play well on the front nine of the second round and held a share of the lead after 28 holes. He would fall back mightily over the next two days, shooting 78-78 to finish at 297 (+9) in a tie for 40th. He would finish low amateur, however, and be interviewed with champion Seve Ballesteros at the end of the tournament on CBS' telecast.

Professional career 
Hallet turned professional in 1984 and participated at PGA Tour Qualifying Tournament that fall but narrowly failed in earning a card. He would narrowly fail the next two seasons as well. His best season during this interim era was in 1987. He finished runner-up in two Asia Golf Circuit events in 1987 and won the circuit's Order of Merit. He also qualified for his first majors as a professional that summer, competing in Open Championship and PGA Championship. His T-21 at the PGA Championship would ultimately be the best major championship performance of his career. Later in the fall Hallet finally secured his PGA Tour card. Competing against roughly "1,000 upper echelon pros" he performed extremely well, finishing runner-up behind John Huston. This circuitous journey to the PGA Tour earned him a full-length profile in The New York Times.

Hallet played full-time on the PGA Tour from 1988 to 1993. He performed solidly on tour his first two years, scoring half a dozen top-10s in total and easily finishing with the top 125 of the money list both years. Hallet was known for his strong work ethic and played nearly every week on tour. In 1990, he had his first chance to win a tournament. In the fall, at the Buick Southern Open, he had a 12-foot putt to defeat his playing partner Kenny Knox but missed. Knox would birdie the second hole of the playoff to defeat him. The next year, at the USF&G Classic in New Orleans, he shot a 65 (−7) in the third round to take a three shot lead entering Sunday. However, he quickly blew his lead over the first six holes until charging back, making four consecutive birdies, and then hitting a 4-iron to 4 feet on the 18th hole for a final birdie to tie. He entered a playoff with Ian Woosnam, then one of the world's best players who would win the Masters and reach #1 in the world within a month. Both players would tie on the first hole before Hallet bogeyed the 2nd, giving Woosnam the win.

The remainder of his PGA Tour career would be much more of a struggle. In 1992 he did not record a top-10 and barely retained his PGA Tour card with a #118 spot on the money list. The 1993 season would be even more of a struggle as he missed the cut in the majority of tournaments he entered and did not finish within the top 150 of the money list. At this stage in his career, wrist injuries hindered his development.

Hallet would never play full-time on tour again. He returned to Cape Cod. In 2008 he joined Bass River Golf Course (where he learned to play golf) and Bayberry Hills Golf Course to work as a teacher. As of May 2019, Hallet still works at Bass River. He has also informally taught the girls' golf team at Dennis-Yarmouth Regional High School.

Amateur wins
1982 Massachusetts State Amateur Championship
1983 Massachusetts State Amateur Championship

Professional wins 
1984 Rhode Island Open
1985 Massachusetts Open
1986 British Columbia Open

Playoff record
PGA Tour playoff record (0–2)

Results in major championships

LA = Low amateur

CUT = missed the half-way cut
"T" = tied

See also
1987 PGA Tour Qualifying School graduates

References

External links 

American male golfers
PGA Tour golfers
Golfers from Massachusetts
People from Hyannis, Massachusetts
People from Yarmouth, Massachusetts
Sportspeople from Barnstable County, Massachusetts
1960 births
Living people